The Committee of Seventy is an independent, non-partisan advocate for better government in Philadelphia that works to achieve clean and effective government, better elections, and informed and engaged citizens. Founded in 1904, it is a nonprofit organization guided by a board of directors made up of business, legal, and civic leaders. They have an app focused on their WeVote initiative. They also sponsor an anti-gerrymandering initiative called Draw the Lines PA.

History
In 1904, the Committee of Seventy was set up with the goal of making voting better, getting more competent and honest people into government, fighting corruption, and keeping people informed and involved in the important issues of the day. The group was a big reason why changes were made to the civil service and why the Home Rule Charters of 1919 and 1951 were passed. By the mid-century, Seventy had broadened its focus to include public policy and civic education.

From 2005 to 2010, Seventy led the fight to defend campaign financing limits, including a lawsuit initiated by Seventy that was eventually heard by the Pennsylvania Supreme Court, to implement tough new public ethics laws, and to sever the tie between contracts and political contributions in Philadelphia. Seventy is still the person to go to for reliable information and analysis about Philadelphia's political culture and government.

Name
The name comes from the Bible. According to the organization's website, "Chronicling the Israelites’ journey through the desert, Exodus tells of seventy elders who were appointed to assist Moses in the governance of the people." In 1904, this Committee of Seventy was so named to represent an analogous function: "to be the ethical backbone of a city forgetting its conscience." The references appear in Exodus 24:1–9, in which God instructs Moses on how to proceed once Israel accepts the Covenant: "And he said unto Moses, "Come up unto the LORD, thou, and Aaron, Nadab, and Abihu, and seventy of the elders of Israel; and worship ye from afar off." Exodus 24:1.

A Committee of Seventy already existed in 19th-century New York City.

Organization and leadership

A Board of over 60 civic, business, labor, and nonprofit leaders leads the Committee of Seventy.  Its current Chair is Eric Kraeutler, a Partner at the law firm of Morgan Lewis.  Seventy operates in a lean staffing mode (a "118-year-old startup") with 6 full-time employees and another 12–15 consultants, project managers, and special advisors at any one point in time. Al Schmidt, a respected longtime civic leader in Philadelphia and a former Philadelphia City Commissioner, has served as president and CEO since January 1, 2022. He succeeded David Thornburgh, who announced his retirement in June 2021 after 6 years leading the organization.

Publications
Seventy provides nonpartisan information on a variety of issues related to government and politics, traditionally focusing on elections and voting, campaign finance, ethics and transparency, and redistricting.

Funding
The Committee of Seventy is an independent, non-profit organization that depends on charitable donations to advance its mission for better government in Philadelphia and Pennsylvania. Seventy's IRS Form 990s are available on their website.

References

External links 

Draw the Lines PA website

Organizations based in Philadelphia
Organizations established in 1904